Sergio Marcon (born 9 November 1970) is an Italian former footballer who played as a goalkeeper. He played for several Italian clubs during his career which lasted from the 1980s to the 2000s.

Football career 
Born in Cormons, Marcon started his career at Sampdoria. He then played some minor clubs. He followed Fidelis Andria promoted to Serie B in summer 1992.

In summer 1994, he joined Udinese of Serie B until November 1994.

Marcon played his second spells for Fidelis Andria in Serie B until summer 1996 the club relegation.

He played for Piacenza of Serie A between 1996 until 1999, as backup of Massimo Taibi and then Matteo Sereni, Valerio Fiori. He played for Chievo as regular starter in Serie B since summer 1999, and won promotion in summer 2001. He played for Ternana in another two Serie B seasons, with Gianmatteo Mareggini as backup.

In summer 2003, he signed for Serie A team A.C. Ancona, where he competed with Alessio Scarpi and Magnus Hedman. After the club's relegation, he re-joined Chievo of Serie A, as backup of Luca Marchegiani.

In summer 2005, he joined Vicenza of Serie B, as backup of Giorgio Sterchele.

External links 
 2005–06 FootballPlus Profile
  Profile at Portogruaro

1970 births
Living people
People from Cormons
Italian footballers
S.S. Teramo Calcio players
S.S. Fidelis Andria 1928 players
U.C. Sampdoria players
Udinese Calcio players
Piacenza Calcio 1919 players
A.C. ChievoVerona players
Ternana Calcio players
A.C. Ancona players
L.R. Vicenza players
A.S.D. Portogruaro players
Serie A players
Serie B players
Association football goalkeepers
Footballers from Friuli Venezia Giulia